The Dean of Guildford is the head (primus inter pares – first among equals) and chair of the chapter of canons, the ruling body of Guildford Cathedral. The dean and chapter are based at the Cathedral Church of the Holy Spirit in Guildford. The cathedral is the mother church of the Diocese of Guildford and seat of the Bishop of Guildford. The current dean is Dianna Gwilliams, who was installed on 15 September 2013.

List of deans
1961–1965 George Clarkson
1968–1986 Tony Bridge
1987–2001 Alex Wedderspoon
2002–2012 Victor Stock
31 July 2012 – 4 September 2013 Nicholas Thistlethwaite (Acting Dean)
4 September 2013–present Dianna Gwilliams

References

Sources
Window on Woking – 1927 Diocese of Guildford Bishops Deans and Archdeacons of Dorking

Deans of Guildford
 
Deans of Guildford